Adobe Illustrator is a vector graphics editor and design program developed and marketed by Adobe Inc. Originally designed for the Apple Macintosh, development of Adobe Illustrator began in 1985. Along with Creative Cloud (Adobe's shift to monthly or annual subscription service delivered over the Internet), Illustrator CC was released. The latest version, Illustrator 2023, was released on October 18, 2022, and is the 27th generation in the product line. Adobe Illustrator was reviewed as the best vector graphics editing program in 2021 by PC Magazine.

History

Versions 1–1.6 (Illustrator 88)
Development of Adobe Illustrator for the Apple Macintosh began in 1985 (shipping in January 1987) as a commercialization of Adobe's in-house font development software and PostScript file format. Adobe Illustrator is the companion product of Adobe Photoshop. Photoshop is primarily geared toward digital photo manipulation and photorealistic styles of computer illustration, while Illustrator provides results in the typesetting and logo graphic areas of design. Early magazine advertisements (featured in graphic design trade magazines such as Communication Arts) referred to the product as "the Adobe Illustrator". Illustrator 88, the product name for version 1.7, was released in 1988 and introduced many new tools and features.

Byte in 1989 listed Illustrator 88 as among the "Distinction" winners of the Byte Awards, stating that with it Adobe had "pulled ahead" of previously industry-dominant competitor Aldus FreeHand.

Early versions of the software did not support working in preview mode and users needed to have two windows open on their desktop in order to have a live preview of their work. One window would show the work in progress and the other window would show a preview of the work in progress.

Versions 2–6
Although during its first decade Adobe developed Illustrator primarily for Macintosh, it sporadically supported other platforms. In the early 1990s, Adobe released versions of Illustrator for Display PostScript licensees NeXT, Digital Equipment Corporation Ultrix, Silicon Graphics IRIX, and Sun Solaris platforms, but they were discontinued due to poor market acceptance. The first version of Illustrator for Windows, version 2.0, was released in early 1989 and flopped. The next Windows version, version 4.0, was widely criticized as being too similar to Illustrator 1.1 instead of the Macintosh 3.0 version, and certainly not the equal of Windows' most popular illustration package CorelDRAW. (Note that there were no versions 2.0 or 4.0 for the Macintosh—although, the second release for the Mac was titled Illustrator 88—the year of its release. And there was no version 6 for Windows.) Version 4 was, however, the first version of Illustrator to support editing in preview mode, which did not appear in a Macintosh version until 5.0 in 1993. Version 6 was the last truly Macintosh version of Illustrator. The interface changed radically with the following version to bring consistency between Mac and Windows computer platforms. The changes remained until CS6 when some small steps were taken to restore the app to a slightly more Mac-like interface.

Versions 7–10

With the introduction of Illustrator 7 in 1997, Adobe made critical changes in the user interface with regard to path editing (and also to converge on the same user interface as Adobe Photoshop), and many users opted not to upgrade. Illustrator also began to support TrueType, effectively ending the "font wars" between PostScript Type 1 and TrueType. Like Photoshop, Illustrator also began supporting plug-ins, greatly and quickly extending its abilities.

With true user interface parity between Macintosh and Windows versions starting with 7.0, designers could finally standardize on Illustrator. Corel did port CorelDRAW FreeHand still not available in Illustrator (higher scaling percentages, advanced find-and-replace feature, selective round-corner editing, export/print selected objects only, etc.). Famously, Aldus made a matrix comparing its own FreeHand to Illustrator and Draw in which Draw's one "win" was that it came with three different clip art views of the human pancreas.

Adobe bought Aldus in 1994 for Page Maker. As part of the transaction, the Federal Trade Commission issued a complaint of Adobe Systems on October 18, 1994, ordering a divestiture of FreeHand to "remedy the lessening of competition resulting from the acquisition" because of Adobe's Illustrator software. As a result, Macromedia acquired Free Hand in 1995 from its original developer, Altsys, and continued its development through 2004.

The difference in strengths between Photoshop and Illustrator became clear with the rise of the Internet, Illustrator was enhanced to support Web publishing, rasterization previewing, PDF, and SVG (Scalable Vector Graphics.) Adobe was an early developer of SVG for the web and Illustrator exported SVG files via the SVG File Format plugin. Using the Adobe SVG Viewer (ASV), introduced in 2000, allowed users to view SVG images in most major browsers until it was discontinued in 2009.  Native support for SVG was not complete in all major browsers until Internet Explorer 9 in 2011.

Illustrator Version 9 included a tracing feature, similar to that within Adobe's discontinued product Streamline.

Illustrator version 10 was released by Adobe in November 2001.

Versions CS–CS6
Illustrator CS (aka version 11), released by Adobe for Mac and Windows in October 2003, was the first version to include 3-dimensional capabilities allowing users to extrude or revolve shapes to create simple 3D objects.

Illustrator CS2 (version 12), released by Adobe in April 2005, was available for both the Mac OS X and Microsoft Windows operating systems. It was the last version for the Mac which did not run natively on Intel processors. Among the new features included in Illustrator CS2 were Live Trace, Live Paint, a control palette and custom workspace. Live Trace allows for the conversion of bitmap imagery into vector art and improved upon the previous tracing abilities. Live Paint allows users more flexibility in applying color to objects, specifically those that overlap. In the same year as the CS2 release, Adobe Systems announced an agreement to acquire Macromedia in a stock swap valued at about $3.4 billion and it integrated the companies' operations, networks, and customer-care organizations shortly thereafter.  Adobe now owned Freehand along with the entire Macromedia product line and in 2007, Adobe announced that it would discontinue development and updates to the Freehand program. Instead, Adobe would provide tools and support to ease the transition to Illustrator.

Illustrator CS3 included interface updates to the Control Bar, the ability to align individual points, multiple Crop Areas, the Color Guide panel and the Live Color feature among others. CS3 was released on March 27, 2007.

CS4 was released in October 2008. It features a variety of improvements to old tools along with the introduction of a few brand-new tools acquired from FreeHand. The ability to create multiple artboards is one of CS4's main additions from Freehand. The artboards allow you to create multiple versions of a piece of work within a single document. Other tools include the Blob Brush, which allows multiple overlapping vector brush strokes to easily merge or join, and a revamped gradient tool allowing for more in-depth color manipulation as well as transparency in gradients.

CS5 was released in April 2010. Along with a number of enhancements to existing functionality, Illustrator CS5's new features include a Perspective Grid tool taken from FreeHand, a Bristle Brush (for more natural and painterly looking strokes) and a comprehensive update to strokes, referred to by Adobe as "Beautiful Strokes".

In 2011 the Adobe Illustrator team developed a vector drawing app for iPad and iPhone, called Adobe Ideas. The app had many of the features of Adobe Illustrator, yet it was a free download. This allowed professionals to sketch and ideate "on the go" and allowed anyone to access world-class vector drawing capabilities. As a result, Facebook and social media posts appeared from all over the world with vector drawings from Adobe Ideas from pros and novices alike. 

Version CS6 was the 16th generation of Adobe Illustrator. Adobe added many more features and several bug fixes such as a new user interface, layer panels, RGB codes, and color ramp to increase performance. CS6 was released on April 23, 2012.

Version CC
Along with Creative Cloud (the result of Adobe's shift on its release strategy), Illustrator CC was released. This version (the 17th) was the first to be only sold in a subscription-based service model, in line with the other software in the formerly called Creative Suite. As part of Creative Cloud, this version brought improvements in that subject such as color, font and program settings syncing, saving documents to the cloud, and integration with Behance (a creative collaborative network), as well as other features such as a new touch-compatible type tool, images in brushes, CSS extraction, and files packaging.

Branding
Starting with version 1.0, Adobe chose to license an image of Sandro Botticelli's "The Birth of Venus" from the Bettmann Archive and use the portion containing Venus' face as Illustrator's branding image. John Warnock desired a Renaissance image to evoke his vision of PostScript as a new Renaissance in publishing, and Adobe employee Luanne Seymour Cohen, who was responsible for the early marketing material, found Venus' flowing tresses a perfect vehicle for demonstrating Illustrator's strength in tracing smooth curves over bitmap source images. Over the years the rendition of this image on Illustrator's splash screen and packaging became more stylized to reflect features added in each version.

The image of Venus was replaced (albeit still accessible via easter egg) in Illustrator CS (11.0) and CS2 (12.0) by a stylized flower to conform to the Creative Suite's nature imagery. In CS3, Adobe changed the suite branding once again, to simple colored blocks with two-letter abbreviations, resembling a periodic table of elements. Illustrator was represented by the letters Ai in white against an orange background (oranges and yellows were prominent color schemes in Illustrator branding going back as far as version 4.0). The CS4 icon is almost identical, except for a slight alteration to the font and the color which is dark gray. The CS5 icon is also virtually the same, except that this time the logo is like a box, along with all the other CS5 product logos, with the "Ai" bright yellow. CS6 changed it a bit to a brown square with a yellow border and yellow lettering, and in CC 2014 the colors were upgraded to a sharper tone and thinner borders.

Compatibility
Compatibility with Inkscape: Inkscape's native format is SVG (Scalable Vector Graphics), which is supported by Adobe Illustrator, but the two implementations are not fully compatible. Inkscape also exports to PS, EPS and PDF, formats which Illustrator can recognize.

Tools
A sidebar that appears at the left of the screen with a variety of tools to select, create, and manipulate objects or artworks in Illustrator. These tools can be selected as following: drawing, typing, painting, reshaping, slicing and cutting, symbolism, moving and zooming, and graph. Some tools have a small triangle at the bottom right of the toolbox icon. A small triangle has the option to view or expand some hidden tools by holding down the mouse button on the triangle.

Some examples of basic tools in Illustrator are selection tools, paintbrush tools, pen tools, pencil tools e.g. Selection tools are used to the layout, adjust, and organize the artwork by selecting, positioning, and stacking objects accurately. Moreover, selection tools can group, lock or hide, and measure objects. Paintbrush tools can be used to modify the appearance of the artwork. There are different types of brushes: calligraphic, scatter, art, pattern, and bristle. Pen tools create straight and curved lines for the artwork and they can add anchor points to paths and delete from paths. Pencil tools allow the user to draw and edit freehand lines.

File formats 
The Adobe Illustrator Artwork format (.ai) is the native Illustrator file format.

The following formats are also supported:

 SVG format
 AutoCAD file formats — Implemented by Drawings SDK (previously Teigha Drawings) by Open Design Alliance.
 AutoCAD Drawing (.dwg)
 AutoCAD Interchange File (.dxf)

Illustrator Draw 
Illustrator Draw was a free-form vector drawing app for Android and iOS users. Along with Illustrator, it is currently marketed by Adobe through Creative Cloud. Drawings made with the Illustrator Draw app can be exported to the desktop programs of Adobe Illustrator.

As of 2022, Illustrator Draw is retired and replaced by Adobe Fresco.

Release history

See also
 .AI file format
 Comparison of vector graphics editors
 Inkscape
 Krita
 Bézier curve
 Vector graphics
 Scalable Vector Graphics

References

External links

 
 

Illustrator
Illustrator
C++ software
IRIX software
Macintosh graphics software
MacOS graphics software
Windows graphics-related software
Vector graphics editors
Illustrator
1987 software